Kim Yong-ik (born 17 May 1947) is a Korean former judoka who competed in the 1972 Summer Olympics.

References

1947 births
Living people
North Korean male judoka
Olympic judoka of North Korea
Judoka at the 1972 Summer Olympics
Olympic bronze medalists for North Korea
Olympic medalists in judo
Medalists at the 1972 Summer Olympics